Oleksandr Mykolayovych Haydash; Aleksandr Nikolaevich Gaydash; (born 7 August 1967 in Mariupol, Ukrainian SSR) is a former Ukrainian (until 2014) and Russian (since 2014) professional football striker.

Career
He played for FC Shakhtar Donetsk, SC Tavriya Simferopol and FC Metalurh Mariupol' in Ukraine and Sarıyer G.K. in the Turkish Süper Lig. He is one of the leading goal-scorer (95) in the Ukrainian Premier League. He also scored 62 goals in the Soviet championship for SC Tavriya Simferopol.

Haydash made two appearances for the Ukraine national football team.

After the annexation of Crimea to Russia took Russian citizenship. Aleksandr Gaydash in 2014 he became a general director of TSK Simferopol.

He is the father of Andriy Gaydash.

References

External links 

 
 Profile at TFF.org

1967 births
Living people
Sportspeople from Mariupol
Ukrainian footballers
Ukraine international footballers
Ukrainian expatriate footballers
FC Shakhtar Donetsk players
SC Tavriya Simferopol players
Sarıyer S.K. footballers
Expatriate footballers in Turkey
Maccabi Herzliya F.C. players
Expatriate footballers in Israel
Association football forwards
FC Mariupol players
Ukrainian Premier League players
Liga Leumit players
Ukrainian football managers
FC Yalos Yalta managers
FC Krymteplytsia Molodizhne managers
FC Feniks-Illichovets Kalinine managers
FC Tytan Armyansk managers
Ukrainian expatriate football managers
Ukrainian expatriate sportspeople in Turkey
Ukrainian expatriate sportspeople in Israel
Ukrainian emigrants to Russia
Naturalised citizens of Russia